Inglish may refer to:

 an alternative spelling of English 
 :pih:Inglish, the Norfuk & Pitkern word for the English language 
 Regularized Inglish, a revised English spelling system
 Ulster English (Ulster Scots: Ulstèr Inglish), a variety of English spoken in parts of Ireland and Northern Ireland
 Claudelle Inglish, a 1961 American movie
 Fort Inglish, the original name of Bonham, Texas
 Inglish (Aurangabad), a village in Aurangabad district, Bihar, India
 Io no spik inglish, the Italian name of the comedy film I Don't Speak English
 Republic v. Inglish, a court case in the Republic of Texas
 a computer parser used in text-adventure computer games, including the 1982 game The Hobbit

People with the surname
 Bailey Inglish, Texas pioneer and founder of Bonham, Texas
 Chuck Inglish (born 1984), American rapper
 Doug Inglish, American photographer